RedruM 781 (born Jermaine Carter) (July 22, 1972 - October 30, 2021) was an American rapper from Inglewood, California. RedruM 781, Tweedy Bird Loc and producer Ronnie Phillips organized hip hop project Bloods & Crips, collaboration between Bloods and Crips members. He is a Piru gang member himself. redruM 781 is also known for his key role on "Bangin' on Wax", he and his fellow female MC Bloody Mary were the two key players for getting this particular Bangin' on Wax project off the ground. He was the cousin of the rapper Kurupt, with whom they had a long-time beef.

History
Carter was born in Bronx, New York. He resided with his mother and young brother there until the age of 5, when he relocated to Inglewood, California with his family. Unfamiliar with their new surroundings and because of the infestation of drug dealers and addicts, pimps and hoes, hustlers, and gang-bangers, his mother feared when he and his young sibling would try to venture outside. Eventually his younger brother was initiated into the Avenue Piru Blood Gang (APG's, in Inglewood, CA), being fearful for his little brothers safety RedRum soon found himself being initiated into the same gang to protect his younger brother. He began to write and rhyme, to express his life experiences through his music. He actively started rapping when he attended Morningside High School, winning several talent shows and contests.

Career

Bloods and Crips
In 1993, "Bangin' on Wax" was a gangster music developed project by both the Bloods and the Crips. At first it seemed impossible that the two rival gangs would collaborate on a music project but the impossible happened. The music project was organized by Ronnie "Ron" Phillips and rappers redruM 781, Tweedy Bird Loc. Actual gang members from both sides auditioned on a tryout and the best ones were chosen for the project. The album was released in 1993 on Warlock Records and was a success selling over at many copies. There is also another album from the Bloods and the Crips on the Bangin' project titled "Bangin' on Wax 2... The Saga Continues", which was released in 1994. After this CD, however, the rappers who appeared on the albums began recording separate albums for Warlock Records, under the group names Nationwide Rip Ridaz (Crips) and Damu Ridas I and II (Bloods). Unfortunately for some of the members of Bangin On Wax were incarcerated or have been killed in gang actions.

Death Row Records and later career
O.Y.G. redruM 781 has shared the booth with rapper Tupac Shakur. During 1993–1994, he joined Death Row Records, the famous label known for artists such as Tupac, Snoop Dogg, Dr. Dre and DJ Quik. That time there gave him a great opportunity to grow in his music, making collaborations with all of these artists in the label directed by the infamous Marion Suge Knight. He has recently shared the stage with the world-famous Ice-T and Dilated Peoples. Redrum has done numerous collaborations with well known West Coast artists such as Kam, N.U.N.E., Big Wy and a big roster of rappers.

Death
Carter died of cancer on October 30, 2021, at the age of 49.

Discography 

 Studio albums
 2007: Back Pay
 2014: Blood Transfusion

 Collaboration album(s)
 1993: Bangin' on Wax (With Bloods & Crips)
 1994: Bangin' on Wax 2... The Saga Continues (With Bloods & Crips)
 1994: Murder Was the Case (With Young Soldierz)
 1994: How Deep Is Your Hood (With Damu Ridas II)
 1996: Bangin' on Wax: Greatest Hits (With Bloods & Crips)
 2006: Rep Yo Set (With Bloods & Crips)

 Mixtape(s)
 2009: Blood Module Mixtape
 2010: Stars & Stripes (With Apollo Mafia)
 2011: The Legend Damu Ridaz

 Guest Appearance(s)
 2013: Everything Aint Always In Color
 2013: Never Settle (with Bossolo & Bigfase100)
 2013: Conspiracy Theory (with Bossolo)

Solo singles

Guest appearances in videos 
 Piru Love
 Bangin' on Wax (Duet)
 Won't Stop Being A Blood
 Shot Kallas
 Piru'N

References

External links
 O.Y.G RedRum 781 at Discogs
 O.Y.G RedRum 781 at UnitedGangs
 O.Y.G RedRum 781 at StreetGangs
 
 

1972 births
2021 deaths
21st-century American male musicians
21st-century American rappers
African-American male rappers
African-American record producers
American hip hop record producers
Bloods
Gangsta rappers
G-funk artists
Rappers from Los Angeles
Record producers from California
Watts, Los Angeles
West Coast hip hop musicians
21st-century African-American musicians
20th-century African-American people